Andy Stewart (born 23 May 1961) is an Australian basketball coach.

Early life
Growing up with his father in the Air Force, Stewart played multiple sports in a number of different locations. He first started playing basketball in Malaysia.

Coaching career

Lakeside Lightning
Stewart is a product of West Australian basketball, having begun his career in the mid 1990s with the Lakeside Lightning. In 1995, he took on the role of Lakeside's Director of Coaching WABL, a position he held until 2015. In 1996, he took on the head coaching role of the Athletes in Action Australia team, a position he held until 2005.

In 2000, Stewart became the inaugural head coach of the Lakeside Lightning's men's SBL team, guiding them to a grand final berth in their first season. By 2005, he helped Lakeside win their first SBL title, later guiding them to three more championships in 2006, 2009 and 2013. He also earned recognition as the league's Coach of the Year five times between 2007 and 2013. During the Lightning's 2013 semi-final series against the East Perth Eagles, Stewart coached his 400th Men's SBL game. His final game as head coach of the Lightning came in the team's 77–74 grand final win over the Wanneroo Wolves, leaving his total as 402 career games. Over those 402 games, he guided the Lightning to 289 wins, missing the playoffs in just one season (2001). He was subsequently named the Assistant Coach of the 25 Year MSBL All-Star Team.

Perth Wildcats and Lynx
Between 2009 and 2014, Stewart served as an assistant coach for the Perth Wildcats under Rob Beveridge and Trevor Gleeson, helping the Wildcats win NBL championships in 2009–10 and 2013–14.

In April 2015, Stewart was appointed head coach of the newly re-branded Perth Lynx for the 2015–16 WNBL season. In his first season at the helm, he guided the Lynx to a Grand Final berth for the first time since 1999. He subsequently earned WNBL Coach of the Year honours for the 2015–16 season.

On 23 April 2016, Stewart re-signed with the Lynx to continue serving as head coach until the end of the 2017–18 season. Stewart coached the Lynx to another finals series in 2016–17, with a 15–9 record. In 2017–18, Stewart's Lynx began the season with a 1–4 start, before winning a franchise-best 14 consecutive games and finishing atop the WNBL ladder for the first time since 1992. At the conclusion of the 2017–18 season, Stewart was named WNBL Coach of the Year for the second time.

On 5 July 2018, Stewart signed a two-year extension with the Lynx.

Other
Stewart has also served as the assistant coach of the WA men's under 20s state team, the head coach of the women's under 20s state team, and the head coach of the Men's SBL tour of Indonesia in 2011. He was named the Department of Sport and Recreation's High Performance Coach of the Year in 2011 and 2012, as well as Community Coach of the Year in 2010.

In 2014, Stewart was named the SBL's Chief Commissioner after many years serving as an SBL Commissioner and Basketball WA Board Member.

Coaching record

WNBL 

|-  
| align="left" | Perth
| align="left" |2015–16
| 24 
| 16
| 8
|
| align="center" |2nd of 9
|3
|1
|2
|
| align="center" |Lost Grand Final
|-
| align="left" | Perth
| align="left" |2016–17
| 24 
| 15
| 9
|
| align="center" |3rd of 8 
|3
|1
|2
|
| align="center" |Lost Semi Finals
|-
| align="left" | Perth
| align="left" |2017–18
| 21 
| 15
| 6
|
| align="center" |1st of 8
|2
|0
|2 
|
| align="center" |Lost Semi Finals
|-
| align="left" | Perth
| align="left" |2018–19
| 21
| 13
| 8
|
| align="center" |4th of 8
|2
|0 
|2 
|
| align="center" |Lost Semi Finals
|-
| align="left" | Perth
| align="left" |2019–20
| 21
| 8
| 13
|
| align="center" |5th of 8
|–
|– 
|–
|–
| align="center" | 
|-class="sortbottom"
| align="left" |Career
| ||111||67||44|||| ||10||2||8||

References

1961 births
Living people
Australian men's basketball coaches
Australian women's basketball coaches
Perth Lynx coaches